Boško Perošević (17 September 1956 – 13 May 2000) was a Serbian politician and former Chairman of the Executive Council of Vojvodina.

Biography
Perošević was born in Odžaci and grew up in the near-by village of Ratkovo. He completed elementary and secondary school in Ratkovo and Odžaci, then Higher School of machine engineering and Economical Faculty in Subotica and received his masters degree at the Technological Faculty in Novi Sad. He visited the Soviet Union as a student and in addition to Serbian, he spoke Russian and English.

In the specialized magazines he released several professional papers, while as a designer of tools and devices he patented several innovations. He published a study Kalupi za injekciono presovanje plastomera and together with three co-authors was published a book Promenama do uspešnog preduzeća.

In the one time he was worked as an engineer in the industry Ivo Lola Ribar from Odžaci, then was in 1992 appointed as a president of the municipal assembly of Odžaci. In this function he spent only one year, and in 1993 he became the Chairman of the Executive Council of Vojvodina.

From that foundation, Perošević was a member of Slobodan Milošević's Socialist Party of Serbia and of the provincial committee of that party and between 1990 and 1995 he was a president of the committee.

Perošević was killed on 13 May 2000, during the tour of Novi Sad Fair, after a shot in the head. His assassin was Milivoje Gutović from Perošević's home village of Ratkovo, the doorman of the Fair.

References

1956 births
2000 deaths
Deaths by firearm in Serbia
People from Odžaci
Assassinated Serbian politicians
Socialist Party of Serbia politicians
Members of the Executive Council of Vojvodina
Assassinations in Serbia
2000 murders in Serbia